Ursa is a Latin word meaning bear. Derivatives of this word are ursine or Ursini.

Ursa may also refer to:

General
 URSA Extracts (United States of America), a California cannabis concentrate company
 Ursa (Finland), a Finnish astronomical association
 Ursa (spider), a spider genus in the family Araneidae
 Ursa Major, the Great Bear constellation
 Ursa Minor, the Small Bear constellation
 HMS Ursa, the name of two ships of the Royal Navy

Places
 Ursa, Illinois, a village in the United States
 Ursa, a village in Gârcov Commune, Olt County, Romania
 Ursa Motoșeni, the former name of Motoșeni Commune, Bacău County, Romania

People
 Urša, feminine given name

Fiction
 Ursa (comics), a fictional villain in Superman media
 Ursa, a fictional monster in the M. Knight Shymalan film After Earth
 A fictional character in Avatar: The Last Airbender
 Ursa, Bear's girlfriend in the TV series Bear in the Big Blue House
 A fictional character in Disney's Adventures of the Gummi Bears
 Ursa, a fictional character in the Open Season franchise
 Ursa Corregidora, protagonist of Corregidora by Gayl Jones
 Ursa Wren, a fictional character in the Disney show Star Wars Rebels, voiced by Sharmila Devar.
 Ursa, a hero in the video games DOTA and DOTA 2.
 Ursas, a type of antagonistic monster featured in the animated web series RWBY

See also
 Ersa (disambiguation)
 Erza
 Ursus (disambiguation)